Miguel Torres Gómez (born 28 January 1986) is a Spanish former footballer. Usually a right-back, he was equally at ease on the other flank.

He played 223 La Liga matches over 11 seasons, in representation of Real Madrid, Getafe and Málaga. He also competed professionally in Greece with Olympiacos.

Club career

Real Madrid
Born in Madrid, Torres joined Real Madrid's junior teams at the age of 12. He made his first-team debut against Écija Balompié as a starter, in a Copa del Rey game on 25 October 2006, because of injuries to defenders Fabio Cannavaro, Cicinho and Míchel Salgado. He also played in the return leg as a substitute after replacing Sergio Ramos in the 80th minute, and started in both cup matches against Real Betis.

Torres made his La Liga debut in his fourth consecutive appearance, playing the whole 90 minutes in the 1–0 home victory over Real Zaragoza on 14 January 2007. He kept his place in the side the following week against RCD Mallorca, with that performance leading coach Fabio Capello to state: "It is not easy to find a player with as much personality and talent in attack and defence as Torres".

On 10 February 2007, against Real Sociedad, Torres made his first assist: after a quick run on the left flank he provided a left-footed (he was right-footed by nature) cross for Ruud van Nistelrooy, whose header found the net as Madrid came from behind to win it away 2–1.

With Torres as an important piece, Real Madrid won their 30th league title; however, he was unable to play in the decisive game with Mallorca due to a hamstring tear. He signed his first professional contract on 12 July 2007, joining the main squad permanently from Real Madrid Castilla.

Although Torres appeared in more league matches in the following season, he would start significantly less as Madrid repeated league honours, primarily due to the signing of Argentine Gabriel Heinze. During the 2008–09 campaign, still under Bernd Schuster first and later Juande Ramos, he did not fare any better; additionally, he switched back from number 38 to 22 which he previously wore with Castilla.

Getafe
On 31 August 2009 – transfer deadline day – Torres moved to neighbours Getafe CF on a five-year contract, with Real having the option to rebuy in the first two. He made 26 appearances in his first season, with qualification to the UEFA Europa League after a sixth-place finish.

Torres was challenged by new signing Juan Valera for the right-back position in the 2011–12 season, under new manager Luis García, but still contributed 23 league matches as the Madrid outskirts team again retained their status. On 16 April 2012 he scored his first goal in the top division, opening a 5–1 home defeat of Sevilla FC.

Olympiacos and Málaga
On 9 August 2013, Torres joined Olympiacos F.C. from Greece on a three-year deal worth a reported €500,000, reuniting with Míchel who also coached him at Getafe and Real Madrid Castilla. After only ten competitive games he returned to Spain's top flight a year later, signing a one-year contract at Málaga CF with the option of two more.

During his later spell at the La Rosaleda Stadium, Torres suffered several injury problems and was also deemed surplus to requirements by manager Juan Ramón López Muñiz. On 4 July 2019, the 33-year-old announced his retirement from football.

International career
Torres made his debut for the Spain under-21 team on 6 February 2007 in a 2–2 draw against England, remaining a regular in subsequent fixtures.

Personal life
In 2021, Torres and actress Paula Echevarría became parents to a son, also named Miguel.

Career statistics

Honours
Real Madrid
La Liga: 2006–07, 2007–08
Supercopa de España: 2008; runner-up: 2007

Olympiacos
Super League Greece: 2013–14

References

External links

1986 births
Living people
Spanish footballers
Footballers from Madrid
Association football defenders
La Liga players
Segunda División players
Tercera División players
Real Madrid C footballers
Real Madrid Castilla footballers
Real Madrid CF players
Getafe CF footballers
Málaga CF players
Super League Greece players
Olympiacos F.C. players
Spain under-21 international footballers
Spanish expatriate footballers
Expatriate footballers in Greece
Spanish expatriate sportspeople in Greece